Semyon Solomonovich Gershtein (13 July 1929 – 20 February 2023) was a Soviet and Russian physicist. He was an academician of Russian Academy of Sciences since 2003. He was a USSR State Prize laureate.

Biography
Gershtein was born in Harbin, China. After graduating from the Department of Nuclear Physics (Faculty of Physics) in Moscow State University, he worked at a school in Kaluga Oblast until 1954. In 1955, he entered the graduate school of the Institute for Physical Problems.

Gershtein was a senior researcher in the Institute for High Energy Physics. He went on to become a professor of the Moscow Institute of Physics and Technology, Doctor of Physical and Mathematical Sciences (1963).

Gershtein authored more than two hundred publications and several scientific discoveries.

Gershtein died in Moscow on 20 February 2023, at the age of 93.

Honors and awards
 Order "For Merit to the Fatherland"  IV class (2005) — for his great contribution to the development of nuclear energy, a productive scientific activities and many years of conscientious work
 Order of Honour (Russia) (25 September 1999) — for services to the state, many years of hard work and great contribution to strengthening friendship and cooperation among peoples
 USSR State Prize
 Pomeranchuk Prize from Institute for Theoretical and Experimental Physics (2011)
 Landau Gold Medal (2013)

Selected publications

References

External links
 Semyon Gershtein profile on the official website of the RAS
 Semyon Gershtein's Articles in the journal "Physics-Uspekhi"

1929 births
2023 deaths
Scientists from Harbin
Corresponding Members of the USSR Academy of Sciences
Full Members of the Russian Academy of Sciences
Recipients of the Order "For Merit to the Fatherland", 4th class
Recipients of the Order of Honour (Russia)
Recipients of the USSR State Prize
Soviet physicists
Russian physicists
Academic staff of the Moscow Institute of Physics and Technology